Daniel Mallory (born 1979) is an American author who writes crime fiction under the name A. J. Finn. His 2018 novel The Woman in the Window was a strong commercial success, which enjoyed positive reviews. The novel has been translated into more than 40 languages, and has sold millions of copies worldwide. It debuted at number one on the New York Times Best Seller list and the Times (UK) list. The Woman in the Window was adapted into a feature film of the same name, directed by Joe Wright and featuring Amy Adams, Julianne Moore and Gary Oldman. It also served as an inspiration for the 2022 Netflix series The Woman in the House Across the Street from the Girl in the Window featuring Kristen Bell. Mallory has spoken openly about his struggle with bipolar depressive disorder.

Mallory’s second novel, to be published in 2024, is a thriller set in San Francisco about a young woman writing the biography of a celebrated crime writer.

Early life and education
Mallory was born in New York and moved with his family to Charlotte, North Carolina, where he attended Charlotte Latin School. He went on to attend Duke University, where he majored in English and acted.

Career
Mallory worked in publishing in New York and London for several years, including in London at Sphere Books, an imprint of Little, Brown and Company. He wrote The Woman in the Window, his first novel, while living in New York and working as a vice president and executive editor at publisher William Morrow and Company, which published The Woman in the Window. It debuted in 2018 at number one on the New York Times Best Seller list but was criticized for key similarities to Sarah A. Denzil's 2016 book Saving April. A feature film starring Amy Adams and Gary Oldman was adapted from the book. The film was originally set for a theatrical release on May 15, 2020, but due to the COVID-19 pandemic was sold to Netflix, which began streaming it on May 14, 2021.

Controversy
A February 2019 article in The New Yorker alleged that Mallory was a habitual liar who feigned fatal illnesses and fabricated a tragic family history. Mallory, the article revealed, had falsely claimed to hold a doctorate from Oxford University, that his mother had died of breast cancer, and that his brother had committed suicide (after impersonating his brother over email to multiple people). Mallory had also falsely claimed to be suffering from cancer himself. Mallory’s psychiatrist told the New Yorker that Mallory sometimes suffered from "somatic complaints, fears, and preoccupations" due to his bipolar depression, while a forensic psychiatrist at King’s College London explained that bipolar episodes “cannot account for sustained arrogant and deceptive interpersonal behaviors.” In a statement through a public relations firm, Mallory said, "It is the case that on numerous occasions in the past, I have stated, implied, or allowed others to believe that I was afflicted with a physical malady instead of a psychological one: cancer, specifically." He continued, "I felt intensely ashamed of my psychological struggles – they were my scariest, most sensitive secret." 

Karin Slaughter, an author who worked with Mallory in his role as an editor at William Morrow, criticized the New Yorker article for its “extraordinary amount of animus” toward Mallory. 

The Washington Post found that "there’s no real suggestion of plagiarism" in the case of The Woman in the Window.

An article published later that month in the New York Times reported on plagiarism rumors due to "striking" similarities between The Woman in the Window and Sarah A. Denzil’s Saving April. The Times reviewed original outlines of The Woman in the Window and concluded that the similar "plot points were all included in outlines for The Woman in the Window that Mr. Mallory sent to a literary agent at ICM in the fall of 2015, before Ms. Denzil began writing Saving April." The Times noted that the Woman in the Window plot outlines it reviewed were dated September 20, 2015 and October 4, 2015, and that Denzil had not started writing Saving April until October 2015. The Times also reported that Mallory had started writing The Woman in the Window in the summer of 2015.

In an interview with the trade publication Publishers Lunch, Denzil explained that she previewed a brief excerpt from Saving April in Kindle Scout in mid-December 2015 and that "March 2016 would have been the earliest point that anyone, aside from me, the Kindle Press team and the copy editor at Kindle Press, would have read the book in its entirety."

Bibliography

References

External links
 Official website

1979 births
Living people
American editors
21st-century American novelists
Writers from New York (state)
Duke University Trinity College of Arts and Sciences alumni
People from Long Island
People with bipolar disorder
American expatriates in England
21st-century pseudonymous writers